The Centre for Strategic Research and Analysis (CESRAN) is an international think-tank organisation, directed by Executive Board of the Centre. The Centre was established on 1 November 2008, by Ozgur Tufekci.

CESRAN’s main goal is to improve interdisciplinary studies. In addition, CESRAN contributes to the field of International Relations as not only academics but also practitioners. In this regard, the main ideal is gathering people, who come from different backgrounds and have different perspectives, around the CESRAN in order to yield fresh and illuminating insights as to how the studies of international relations, political science, human geography, economics and international law are carried out in an interdependent world.

Organisation

 The Executive Office
 Advisory Board
 Board of Directors

The Executive Office
 Prof. Alpaslan Ozerdem, President
 Mr. Ozgur Tufekci, Director-General
 Mr. Husrev Tabak, Deputy Director-General

The Advisory Board
 Prof. Mustafa Aydın, Rector of Kadir Has University
 Baroness Hussein-Ece OBE, Liberal Democrat Member of the House of Lords
 Prof. Mark Bassin, Professor of History of Ideas, Södertörn University
 Prof. Bulent Gokay, Professor of International Relations, Keele University
 Dr Ayla Gol, Lecturer in International Politics, h University
 Prof. Bayram Gungor
 Prof. Roger Mac Ginty Professor of Peace & Conflict Studies University of Manchester
 Prof Ibrahim Sirkeci, Professor in Demography at Regent's College London and Prof. in Business and Management
 Prof. Birol Yesilada, Professor of Political Science and International Relations, Portland State University

Research Centres

 Mr Rahman Dag | Turkey Focus, Research Director
 Mr Kadri Kaan Renda | Europe Programme, Research Director
 Mr Jewellord Singh | Americas Programme, Research Director
 Mr Antony Ou | China & Neighbourhood Focus, Research Director
 Dr Fatih Eren | Urban Studies, Research Director
 Dr Aksel Ersoy | Governance, Research Director
 Dr Jean-Paul Gagnon | Democracy Programme, Research Director
 Dr Mehmet Ozkan | Africa Programme, Research Director

Publications

 Journal of Global Analysis (JGA): CESRAN publishes an interdisciplinary, refereed e-journal, named Journal of Global Analysis (JGA). Journal of Global Analysis is a biannual journal edited by a group of international scholars. The Journal endeavours to become the foremost international forum for academics, researchers and policy makers to share their knowledge and experience in the disciplines of political science, international relations, economics, international law and human geography.
 Journal of Conflict Transformation & Security (JCTS): Journal of Conflict Transformation & Security (JCTS). The Journal of Conflict Transformation and Security (JCTS) provides a platform to analyse conflict transformation and security as processes for managing ‘change’ in a non-violent way to produce equitable outcomes for all parties that are sustainable. A wide range of human security concerns can be tackled by both ‘hard’ and ‘soft’ measures, therefore, the Journal’s scope not only covers such security sector reform issues as restructuring security apparatus, reintegration of ex-combatants, clearance of explosive remnants of war and cross-border management, but also the protection of human rights, justice, rule of law and governance.
 Journal of Eurasian Politics & Security (JEPAS): The Journal of Eurasian Politics & Society is the only established peer reviewed, multi-disciplinary journal in the world concerned with the history, politics, cultures, religions and economies of Eurasian states. The journal acts as a forum for cultural, economic, historical and political approaches to research on Eurasia. The main aim of the journal is to reflect and promote advances in the social sciences and humanities and also deepen and consolidate understanding of processes of local and regional change that make Eurasia an area of significant interest.
 Another publication of CESRAN is Political Reflection Magazine PR is a quarterly International Magazine.
 CESRAN Papers
 Turkey Focus Policy Brief

References

External links
 Official site
 Journal of Global Analysis, CESRAN's interdisciplinary refereed journal
 Ibrahim Sirkeci

Security studies
Political and economic think tanks based in the United Kingdom
Foreign policy and strategy think tanks
Think tanks established in 2008